Lecidella elaeochroma is a species of fungi belonging to the family Lecanoraceae.

It has cosmopolitan distribution.

References

Lecanoraceae
Lichen species
Taxa named by Erik Acharius